The equestrian statue of Frederick William IV is an 1875–86 sculpture of Frederick William IV of Prussia by Alexander Calandrelli, installed in front of the Alte Nationalgalerie in Berlin, Germany.

See also

 1886 in art

References

External links
 

1886 establishments in Germany
1886 sculptures
Equestrian statues in Germany
Statues in Berlin
Outdoor sculptures in Berlin
Sculptures of men in Germany
Statues of monarchs